Little Polecat Creek is a  long 3rd order tributary to Polecat Creek in Halifax County, Virginia.

Course 
Little Polecat Creek rises about 3 miles west of Halifax, Virginia  in Halifax County and then flows northeast to join Polecat Creek about 2.5 miles northwest of Halifax.

Watershed 
Little Polecat Creek drains  of area, receives about 45.5 in/year of precipitation, has a wetness index of 390.37, and is about 53% forested.

See also 
 List of Virginia Rivers

References 

Rivers of Halifax County, Virginia
Rivers of Virginia